Sarah Wright (born 1983) is an American actress.

Sarah Wright may also refer to:

Sarah Wright (footballer) (born 1994), Australian rules footballer
Sarah E. Wright (1928–2009), American writer

See also
Sara Wright (born 1969), Bermudian sailor